Widows is a 1976 Soviet drama film directed by Sergey Mikaelyan.

Plot 
The film tells about two elderly widows who live in the same house. They are united not only by tragedy, but also by common concern, namely the grave of two unknown soldiers, which they have been guarding for over 30 years. And suddenly the managers of their district decide to turn the grave into a memorial.

Cast 
 Galina Makarova as Shura
 Galina Skorobogatova as Liza
 Gennadi Lozhkin as Boris
 Borislav Brondukov as Galkin
 Yuri Kayurov as Krotov
 Raisa Maksimova as Alla
 Mikhail Pogorzhelsky as Kireev
 Vladimir Pitsek as Alla's husband
 Larisa Chikurova	as Nadya Kharitonova
 Yuriy Dubrovin as Voronkov

References

External links 
 

1976 films
1970s Russian-language films
Soviet drama films
1976 drama films
Lenfilm films
Films based on actual events